Due note is an album by Italian singer Mina, issued in 1961.

The song "Piano" is the original version of "Softly, as I Leave You", translated in English by Hal Shaper in 1961. The English version of the song has been covered by many international artists, such as Frank Sinatra, Doris Day, Elvis Presley, Shirley Bassey, Shirley Horn and Michael Bublé.

Leon René's song, "Gloria", has been covered by Mina a second time, in its original version, in her 1987's album Rane supreme.

Track listing

Side A

Side B

1961 albums
Mina (Italian singer) albums
Italian-language albums